Nanna Popham Britton (November 9, 1896 – March 21, 1991) was an American secretary who was a mistress of Warren G. Harding, the 29th President of the United States. In 1927, she revealed that her daughter, Elizabeth, had been fathered by Harding while he was serving in the United States Senate, one year before he was elected to the presidency. Her claim was open to question during her life, but was confirmed by DNA testing in 2015.

Relationship with Harding
Nan's father, Samuel H. Britton, spoke to Harding about his daughter's infatuation, and Harding met with her, telling her that some day she would find the man of her dreams. Harding was already married and involved in a passionate affair with Carrie Fulton Phillips, wife of James Phillips, co-owner of a local department store. After she graduated from high school in 1914, Britton moved to New York City, to begin a career as a secretary. However, she claimed she also began an intimate relationship with Harding.

Following Harding's death, Britton wrote what is considered to be the first kiss-and-tell book. In The President's Daughter, published in 1927, she told of her life as  Harding's mistress throughout his presidency and named him as the father of her daughter, Elizabeth Ann (1919–2005). One famous passage told of their having sex in a coat closet in the executive office of the White House.

According to Britton, Harding had promised to support their daughter, but after his sudden death in 1923, his wife Florence refused to honor the obligation. Britton insisted that she wrote her book to earn money to support her daughter and to champion the rights of illegitimate children. She brought a lawsuit (Britton v. Klunk), but she was unable to provide any concrete evidence and was shaken by the vicious personal attacks made by Congressman Grant Mouser during the cross examination, which cost her the case.

Britton's portrayal of Harding and his colloquialisms paints a picture of a crude womanizer. In his 1931 book Only Yesterday: An Informal History of the 1920s, Frederick Lewis Allen wrote that on the testimony of Britton's book, Harding's private life was "one of cheap sex episodes" and that "one sees with deadly clarity the essential ordinariness of the man, the commonness of his 'Gee dearie' and 'Say, you darling'." Britton's book was among those irreverently reviewed by Dorothy Parker for The New Yorker magazine as part of her famous Constant Reader column, under the title "An American DuBarry".

In 1964, the discovery of more than 250 love letters that Harding had written to Carrie Fulton Phillips between 1909 and 1920 gave further support to Britton's own claims.  Journalist R. W. Apple Jr. found Britton, who had long lived in seclusion, but was refused an interview. At the time, she was living in the Chicago area. Even at this time, over a generation later, her daughter and grandchildren would "occasionally be hounded by hateful skeptics" with threats and other unwanted attention that seemed to intensify during presidential elections.

In the 1980s, Britton and her extended family moved to Oregon, where her three grandchildren were living as of 2015. Britton died in 1991 in Sandy, Oregon, where she had lived during the last years of her life. She insisted until her death that Harding was her daughter's father. Twenty-four years after her death, in 2015, Ancestry.com confirmed through DNA testing of descendants of Harding's brother and Britton's grandchildren that Elizabeth was indeed Harding's daughter.

Citations

General sources 
 Anthony, Carl Sferrazza. Florence Harding, William Morrow and Co., New York City, 1998, 
 Britton, Nan. The President's Daughter. Elizabeth Ann Guild, Inc., New York City, 1927 (reprinted 1973), .
 Dean, John; Schlesinger, Arthur M. Warren Harding, The American President Series, Times Books, 2004, 
 Ferrell, Robert H. The Strange Death of President Harding, University of Missouri Press, 1996, 
 Mee, Charles Jr. The Ohio Gang: The World of Warren G. Harding: A Historical Entertainment, M. Evans & Company, 1983,

External links
 Letter documenting how Warren G. Harding tried to help Nan Britton land a job Shapell Manuscript Foundation
 

1896 births
1991 deaths
19th-century American women
20th-century American women writers
20th-century American memoirists
American women memoirists
Mistresses of United States presidents
People from Marion, Ohio
People from Sandy, Oregon
Warren G. Harding
Writers from Ohio